Chrysler's D platform is the name used by Chrysler for the platform derived from the Mitsubishi Galant and used by the front-wheel drive and all-wheel drive Diamond Star Motors cars in the 1990s. The original D platform debuted in 1990 and was refreshed in 1995 as the PJ platform.  Another DSM platform derived from the Galant, the FJ platform, debuted in 1995 for use in the Chrysler Sebring and Dodge Avenger.

BD
 1990-1994 Mitsubishi Eclipse/Plymouth Laser/Eagle Talon

PJ
 1995-1999 Mitsubishi Eclipse
 1995-1998 Eagle Talon

FJ
 1995-2000 Chrysler Sebring/Dodge Avenger coupes

ST-22
 2000-2005 Mitsubishi Eclipse
 2001-2005 Chrysler Sebring/Dodge Stratus coupes

See also
 Chrysler platforms
 Diamond Star Motors

Chrysler originally used the title D platform in 1957-1973 for the large RWD Imperial.

References

D
Road transport-related lists